The siege of Narbonne was fought in 737 between the Arab and Berber Muslim forces of Yusuf ibn Abd al-Rahman al-Fihri, Arab Umayyad Muslim governor of Septimania on behalf of al-Andalus, and the Frankish Christian army led by the Carolingian king Charles Martel.

Background

The region of Septimania was invaded by al-Samh ibn Malik al-Khawlani, wāli (governor-general) of al-Andalus, in 719, and subsequently occupied by the Arab and Berber Muslim forces in 720. The region was renamed Arbūnah and turned into a military base for future operations by the Andalusian military commanders.

By 721, al-Samh was reinforced and ready to lay siege to Toulouse, a possession that would open up the bordering region of Aquitaine to him on the same terms as Septimania. But his plans were thwarted in the disastrous battle of Toulouse in 721; the Aquitanian Christian army led by Odo the Great, Duke of Aquitaine defeated the Umayyad Muslim army and achieved a decisive and significant victory. The surviving Umayyad forces drove away from Aquitaine with immense losses, in which al-Samh was so seriously wounded that he soon died at Narbonne.

Arab and Berber Muslim forces, soundly based in Narbonne and easily resupplied by sea, struck in the 720s, conquering Carcassonne on the north-western fringes of Septimania (725) and penetrating eastwards as far as Autun (725). In 731, the Berber lord of the region of Cerdagne, Uthman ibn Naissa, called Munuza by the Franks, was an ally of the Duke of Aquitaine Odo the Great after he revolted against the Emirate of Córdoba, but the rebel lord was killed by the Arab Umayyad commander Abd al-Rahman ibn Abd Allah al-Ghafiqi. Following his success at the siege of Avignon in 737, Charles Martel besieged Narbonne but his forces were unable to take the city, after which the Frankish army marched on Nîmes.

Battle

In 737, the Carolingian king Charles Martel went on to attack Narbonne, but the local nobility of Gothic and Gallo-Roman stock had concluded different military and political arrangements to oppose the expanding Frankish realm. Charles Martel attempted to conquer the whole region of Septimania and besieged Narbonne in 737 but his forces were unable to take the city. However, when the Arabs sent reinforcements from Muslim-ruled Iberia, the Frankish Christian army intercepted them at the mouth of the River Berre (located in the present-day Département of Aude) and achieved a decisive and significant victory, after which the Frankish army marched on Nîmes.

Retreat
The Frankish king Charles Martel may have been able to take Narbonne had he been willing to commit his army and full resources for an indefinite siege, but he was not willing or able to do so. Probably he found that Hunald I, Duke of Aquitaine, was threatening his line of communication with the north. Furthermore, Maurontius, patrician of Provence, from his unconquered city of Marseille, raised a revolt against him from the rear. The Frankish king may have considered accomplished his primary goals by destroying the Arab Muslim armies in Septimania, and leaving the remaining Arab and Berber garrison confined to the city of Narbonne.

A second Frankish expedition was led later in 739 to expel the inconvenient count Maurontius, who couldn't expect this time Andalusian relief, from Marseille and regain control of Provence. According to Paul the Deacon's historical treatise Historia Langobardorum (787–796), the Arab Muslims retreated when they learned that Charles Martel had formed an alliance with the Lombards, leaving the Umayyad forces stationed in the area and Maurontius himself too weak to meet in open battle.

References

Narbonne
730s in the Umayyad Caliphate
737
8th century in Francia
History of Narbonne
Narbonne 737
Narbonne 737
Narbonne 737